Jonathan Lacôte (born 15 September 1972) is a French diplomat who served as Ambassador Extraordinary and Plenipotentiary of France to Armenia from 2017 to 2021.

Biography 
Jonathan Lacôte attended school in Hove (United Kingdom), Treillières, Nantes and Lycée Condorcet in Paris. A graduate of the Institute of Political Studies of Paris and of the National Institute of Oriental Languages and Civilizations (INALCO) in Hungarian and Estonian, he entered the Ministry of Foreign Affairs through the competition of foreign affairs adviser in 1997. He has taught as a lecturer at IEP Paris and at INALCO. 

After serving in the Common Foreign and Security Policy (CFSP), he was appointed  an adviser to the French Embassy in Belgrade (then in the Federal Republic of Yugoslavia) in 2001 before becoming the head of the office of the French Embassy in Podgorica, Montenegro, before the country's accession to independence, in 2003. A first Secretary at the French Embassy in Berlin in 2005, he became technical advisor in charge of European Union external relations and Franco-German cooperation in the office of the Secretary of State for European Affairs, Jean-Pierre Toy, in 2007 . He kept these functions with his successor, Bruno Le Maire, before becoming deputy director in June 2009 and  then in July 2009 - a Director of the Cabinet of the Secretary of State for European Affairs, Pierre Lellouche.

Deputy Director of Personnel at the Human Resources Department of the Ministry of Foreign Affairs from 2011, he was Minister-Counselor (Deputy Head of Mission) at the French Embassy in London from 2014 to 2017.  In 2017, he was appointed Ambassador of France to Armenia until August 2021 when he was replaced by Anne Louyot.

References 

1972 births
Living people
French diplomats
Ambassadors of France to Armenia